Stephen John Hay (October 5, 1864 – February 29, 1916) was the first mayor of Dallas, Texas under the commission form of government.

Biography
Born in Griffin, Georgia, Hay left for Atlanta as a young man to work in a department store and take business classes at night.  At the age of 23 he moved to Dallas and was elected to his first public office in 1899 as a member of the school board.  He served four terms and two years as its president before resigning in 1907 to run for Mayor of Dallas.  Hay served two terms as mayor from 1907 to 1911.  His largest accomplishments were demonstrating that a commission form of city government could work well and launching the White Rock Reservoir plan.  After leaving office he served as president of the Dallas Trust and Savings Bank, director of The Texas Paper Company, and on the City Health Board.  Hay was also one of the founders of Trinity Methodist Church in Dallas, where he served two years as the President of the board of stewards for the church and often preached lay sermons.  He died suddenly of meningitis at his home at 2809 McKinney Ave. in Dallas at 51 years of age.

References

External links

Handbook of Texas Online - HAY, STEPHEN JOHN at www.tshaonline.org

1864 births
1916 deaths
People from Griffin, Georgia
Mayors of Dallas
Deaths from meningitis
19th-century American politicians
Neurological disease deaths in Texas
Infectious disease deaths in Texas